Thomas Selby may refer to:

 Thomas Selby (cricketer, born c.1765), English cricketer
 Thomas Selby (cricketer, born 1791) (1791–1874), Kent cricketer
 Thomas Selby (cricketer, born 1851) (1851–1924), English cricketer for Derbyshire
 Thomas Henry Selby (1820–1875), American politician, mayor of San Francisco
 Thomas J. Selby (1840–1917), American politician, U.S. Representative from Illinois